South Lancashire is a geographical county area, used to indicate the southern part of the historic county of Lancashire, today without any administrative purpose. The county region has no exact boundaries but generally includes areas that form the West Derby Hundred and the Salford Hundred, both of which formed the South Lancashire parliament constituency from 1832. This constituency was further divided in 1868 forming the South East Lancashire and South West Lancashire constituencies. Today the area is still recognized by the government and organisations, including the National Health Service. South Lancashire includes the cities of Manchester and Liverpool.

History
In 1881, the South Lancashire Regiment was formed with the barracks located in Warrington. The regiment primarily recruited around the South Lancashire area.

Following reforms of local government and the Local Government Act 1972, the majority of South Lancashire fell into the metropolitan counties of Greater Manchester and Merseyside, however South Lancashire is still recognized and in use today.

The rivalry fixtures between Rochdale and Bury was referred to as the South Lancashire derby. However, more recently with Bury being expelled from the football league, games between Bolton Wanderers and Wigan Athletic is more often referred to as the South Lancashire derby.

The travel company South Lancs Travel services Bolton and Wigan; the company was bought by Diamond Bus North West in 2015.

South Lancashire held the largest area of the Lancashire Coalfield during the coal mining era of the counties history.

The area is home to Old Trafford Cricket Ground and the Lancashire County Cricket Club.

Places encompassed by South Lancashire
West Derby Hundred and Salford Hundred

Aintree
Ashton-in-Makerfield
Ashton-under-Lyne
Astley
Atherton
Aughton
Bolton le Moors
Bootle
Bury
Crosby
Deane
Eccles
Eccleston
Everton
Flixton
Hardshaw within Windle
Ince-in-Makerfield
Formby
Huyton
Heaton Norris
Kirkby
Leigh
Litherland
Liverpool
Lunt
Lydiate
Maghull
Manchester
Middleton
Newton-le-Willows
North Meols
Ormskirk
Pemberton
Prescot
Prestwich-cum-Oldham
Rochdale
Radcliffe
Rainford
St Helens
Sefton
Skelmersdale
Southport
Tyldesley
Toxteth
Warrington
West Derby
Wigan
Widnes

See also
South Lancashire Regiment
South Lancashire Counties League
South Lancashire Tramways
Central Lancashire

References

History of Lancashire
Geography of Lancashire